Chaudhry Hamid Hameed (born 2 March 1972) is a Pakistani politician who has been a member of the National Assembly of Pakistan, since August 2018. Previously he was a member of the National Assembly from June 2013 to May 2018.

Early life

He was born on 2 March 1972.

Political career
He served as Mayor of Sargodha.

He ran for the seat of the National Assembly of Pakistan as a candidate of Pakistan Muslim League (N) (PML-N) from Constituency NA-66 (Sargodha-III) in 2002 Pakistani general election but was unsuccessful. He received 29,496 votes and lost the seat to Tasneem Ahmed Qureshi.

He ran for the seat of National Assembly as a candidate of PML-N from Constituency NA-66 (Sargodha-III) in 2008 Pakistani general election but was unsuccessful. He received 65,020 votes and lost the seat to Tasneem Ahmed Qureshi. In the same election, he ran for the seat of the Provincial Assembly of the Punjab as an independent candidate from Constituency PP-33 (Sargodha-VI) but was unsuccessful. He received 236 votes and lost the seat to Chaudhry Abdul Razzaq Dhillon.

He was elected to the National Assembly as a candidate of PML-N from Constituency NA-66 (Sargodha-III) in 2013 Pakistani general election. He received 133,085 votes and defeated Mumtaz Kahloon. During his tenure as Member of the National Assembly, he served as the Federal Parliamentary Secretary for Kashmir Affairs and Gilgit Baltistan.

He was re-elected to the National Assembly as a candidate of PML-N from Constituency NA-90 (Sargodha-III) in 2018 Pakistani general election.

References

Living people
Pakistan Muslim League (N) MNAs
Punjabi people
Pakistani MNAs 2013–2018
1972 births
Pakistani MNAs 2018–2023